Howell Crawford Sasser (born 1937) is an Episcopalian priest who was  Archdeacon of Gibraltar from 2002 to 2005.

Ney was educated at Maryland University. He was ordained Deacon in 1977; and Priest in 1978. He served in Germany (1977–80), Somalia (1980–83), Cyprus (1984–92), Switzerland (1992-97) and St James' Church, Porto, Portugal (1997-2005).

References

20th-century Anglican priests
21st-century Anglican priests
Archdeacons of Gibraltar
University of Maryland, College Park alumni
1937 births
American military chaplains
Living people
20th-century American clergy
21st-century American clergy